Claude Jean-Prost (20 November 1936 – 7 January 2018) was a French ski jumper. He competed in the individual event at the 1960 Winter Olympics.

References

1936 births
2018 deaths
French male ski jumpers
Olympic ski jumpers of France
Ski jumpers at the 1960 Winter Olympics
Sportspeople from Jura (department)